Geronne Black (born 26 October 1989) is a Trinidadian sprinter. She competed in the 60 metres event at the 2014 IAAF World Indoor Championships.

References

1989 births
Living people
Trinidad and Tobago female sprinters
Place of birth missing (living people)